Anne Manning may refer to:

 Anne Manning (novelist) (1807–1879), British novelist
 Anne Manning (racewalker) (born 1959), retired racewalker from Australia